Lalmonirhat (Lalmonirhat Jela also Lalmonirhat Zila) is a district, situated at the northern border of Bangladesh. It is a part of the Rangpur Division. Lalmonirhat mahakuma  was established as a district on 1 February 1984. It lies north of Kochbihar and Jalpaiguri of West Bengal, south of Ranpur, east of Kurigram and Kochbihar and west of Rangpur and Nilphamari district. The international border line of Lalmonirhat district is 281.6 km long.

Etymology 
At the end of 19th century the workers of the Bengal Duras Railway (BDR) while digging the mud for the installation of rail line, found a red color stone and since then, the place was recognized as Lalmoni. Whereas some legendary opinions that the railway which acquire the land owned by a lady named Lalmoni for which people kept the place after her name as the recognition of her contribution of land for the rail line. Others are of the opinion that in 1783 a woman named Lalmoni along with peasant leader, Nuruldin fought against the English soldiers and land lords for the cause to establish the interest of general peasants and laid down her life against the atrocity of the rulers. The place was named as the Lalmoni as the sign of respect. The word "hat" became adhered to her name in the course of time.

History 
Lalmonirhat emerged as a district from mahakuma by the inauguration of then gender and social welfare minister of Bangladesh government Dr. Shafia Khatun on 1 February 1984. After that Lalmonirhat sadar thana was established as a upazila on 18 March 1984. As a result, the number of upazilas in Lalmonirhat district becomes 5 which are Patgram, Hatibandha, Kaliganj, Aditmari and Lalmonirhat Sadar. In that time, Sinai, Rajarhat and Gharialdanga union was added to Kurigram District and the number of union of Lalmonirhat district and municipalities becomes 41 and 1 respectively. Alongside the area of Lalmonirhat Sadar becomes 104 sq. miles. After 1985, Dahagram and Angarpota enclaves became a single union of Patgram upazila and then the total number of union becomes 42.

Subdistricts 
There are 5 upazilas, 5 thanas, 45 unions, 354 mouzas and 478 villages in Lalmonirhat.  The upazilas are:

 Lalmonirhat Sadar has an area of 259.54 km2. It lies north of  Kochbihar of India and Aditmari upazila of Kurigram district, south of Kaunia upazila of Rangpur district and Rajarhat upazila of Kurigram district, east of Phulbai and Rajarhat upazila of Kurigram district, west of  Aditmari upazila of Lalmonirhat district and Gangachara upazila of Rangpur district.
 Aditmari has an area of 190.03 km2. It lies north of Kochbihar district of India, south of Gangachar upazila of Rangpur district, east of Lalmonirhat Sadar upazila, west of Kaliganj upazila.
 Kaliganj has an area of 236.96 km2. It lies north of Kochbihar district of India and Hatibandha upazila of Lalmonirhat, south of Gangachara upazila of Rangpur and Kishorganj upazila of Nilphamari district, east of  Aditmari upazila, west of Jaldhaka upazila of Nilphamari district.
 Hatibandha has an area of 288.42 km2. It lies north of Kochbihar district of India and Patgram upazila of Lalmonirhat, south of  Kaliganj upazila, east of Kochbihar district of India, west of Dimla and Jaldhaka upazila of Nilphamari.
 Patgram has an area of 261.51. It lies north, east and west of Kochbihar district of India and Hatibandha upazila.

Geography 
Lalmonirhat is in the north of Bangladesh. There are six rivers in Lalmonirhat district. Teesta is one of the main rivers in this district.  The total length of Tista river is 315 km, 115 km of which is in Bangladesh. The total arable land is 98,875 hectares.

Demographics 

According to the 2011 Bangladesh census, Lalmonirhat District had a population of 1,256,099, of which 628,799 were males and 627,300 females. Rural population was 1,117,414 (88.96%) while the urban population was 138,685 (11.04%). Lalmonirhat district had a literacy rate of 46.09% for the population 7 years and above: 49.30% for males and 42.89% for females.

Muslim make up 86.02% of the population, while Hindus are 13.90% of the population.

The dialect of the region is Rangpuria.

Education 
Lalmonirhat has 26 colleges, 212 secondary schools, 754 primary schools, 85 madrasas, 3 polytechnical institutes and 1 technical school and college. Lalmonirhat is one of the seven illiteracy free districts in Bangladesh. The literacy rate of Lalmonirhat is 65%.

Economy 
Agriculture is the major income source. 72.78% of people are farmers, 10.49% are businessmen, 3.46% are labourers, and 4.45% are employees.

Notable residents 
 Sheikh Fazlul Karim, poet, born on 14 April 1883 in Kakina village in Kaliganj thana

Notes

References

External links

 Official website of Lalmonirhat district

 
Districts of Bangladesh